The Order of battle at the Battle of Genoa recounts the British-Neapolitan and French fleets which participated in a short campaign in the Gulf of Genoa during the French Revolutionary Wars. The campaign featured the principal Battle of Genoa on 13–14 March 1795, and an earlier smaller battle off Cap Corse on 8 March. Losses were even: although the British succeeded in capturing two French ships in the main action, two British ships were also lost elsewhere during the campaign. The French foray into the Ligurian Sea was driven back to a safe harbour, resulting in a restoration of the British blockade of Toulon, and leading to a second battle later in the year.

The campaign began on 3 March when the French Mediterranean Fleet sailed from the naval base at Toulon for an operation in the Ligurian Sea. During the winter they had been under constant blockade from a British fleet based at San Fiorenzo on Corsica, which had been captured in a British invasion the previous year. In February the British fleet, under the command of Vice-Admiral William Hotham, had sailed from San Fiorenzo to Leghorn for repairs, leaving behind HMS Berwick, damaged in a January storm. When news of Hotham's withdrawal reached Toulon, Contre-amiral Pierre Martin sailed the French fleet out and caught Berwick off the northern coast of Corsica. The damaged ship was unable to outrun pursuit and surrendered at the action of 8 March 1795 after the captain was decapitated by French shot.

Hotham discovered Martin's movements and sailed to meet him, encountering the French near Cape Noli on 10 March. For several days both fleets lay becalmed, unable to come to action. On 13 March the wind increased and Hotham attacked, Martin falling back under pursuit. One of Martin's rearguard, Ça Ira, collided with another ship and fell back. Ça Ira was engaged by first the frigate HMS Inconstant and then HMS Agamemnon under Captain Horatio Nelson. Elsewhere there was scattered fighting between other British and French ships. Over night the French flagship accidentally detached from the fleet, and in the morning Hotham renewed the attack, overwhelming Ça Ira and the Censeur, sent to support it. A French counterattack was beaten off, although HMS Illustrious and HMS Courageux were badly damaged.

Hotham declined to renew the action due to concern for his damaged ships, to the frustration of his subordinates, particularly Nelson. The French withdrew to Gourjean Bay and then Toulon, and the British to the Gulf of La Spezia. There a storm drove the damaged Illustrious ashore, and the ship was destroyed. In the aftermath both fleets refitted and prepared for another engagement; in early July the French fleet was again attacked by the British, at the Battle of the Hyères Islands, and the rearmost ship Alcide was overrun and destroyed.

Hotham's fleet
Note that as carronades were not traditionally taken into consideration when calculating a ship's rate, these ships may have been carrying more guns than indicated below. Officers killed in action are marked with a  symbol.
  British Royal Navy
  Navy of the Kingdom of Naples

Martin's fleet
Note that the number of guns refers to the official complement, traditionally taken into consideration when calculating a ship's rate, and that these ships may have been carrying more guns than indicated below, although obusiers were not carried on French ships in this battle, Officers killed in action are marked with a  symbol.

Notes

References

Bibliography 
 
 
 
 
 
 
 
 
 
  (1671-1870)
 
 

Conflicts in 1795
French Revolutionary Wars orders of battle